James Michael Fisher (born April 22, 1958) is a former American football wide receiver. He played for the St. Louis Cardinals in 1981.

References

1958 births
Living people
American football wide receivers
Baylor Bears football players
St. Louis Cardinals (football) players